The 1974 Southeastern 500 was a NASCAR Winston Cup Series racing event that was held on March 17, 1974, at Bristol International Speedway in Bristol, Tennessee.

Only manual transmission vehicles were allowed to participate in this race; a policy that NASCAR has retained to the present day.

Background
Bristol Motor Speedway is a NASCAR short track venue located in Bristol, Tennessee. Constructed in 1960, it held its first NASCAR race on July 30, 1961. Despite its short length, Bristol is among the most popular tracks on the NASCAR schedule because of its distinct features, which include extraordinarily steep banking, an all concrete surface, two pit roads, and stadium-like seating. It has also been named one of the loudest NASCAR tracks.

Race report
There were 30 American-born drivers on the grid; the distance of the race was 500 laps. Jabe Thomas was credited as the last-place finisher due to problems with his oil pan on lap 63 of the race. The first 50 laps of the race were not scored due to the fuel crisis that took place during this year. Donnie Allison, Cale Yarborough, Bobby Isaac, Benny Parsons, and Bobby Allison would be the respective leaders for certain parts of the race. After three hours and forty-two minutes of racing, Cale Yarborough defeated Bobby Isaac by one lap in front of a live audience of eighteen thousand people. Yarborough would be the only driver on the lead lap by the end of the race. With a strong second-place run with Issac at the wheel, this was the last race for car owner Banjo Matthew and his famous #27 team.

Most of the drivers in the race either used Chevrolet or Ford vehicles for their official racing vehicle; Chevrolet swept the entire top-ten for this race. The total purse of this race was $45,075 ($ when adjusted for inflation). Donnie Allison achieved the pole position for this race by driving up to  during solo qualifying runs.

The model years of the vehicles ranged from 1972 to 1974; complying with the homologation policies set forth by NASCAR during this era. Engine issues and accidents were the main reasons for the DNFs found in this racing event. Joe Mihalic would have the best finish of his NASCAR Winston Cup Series career at this race.

Qualifying

Top 10 finishers

Timeline
Section reference: 
 Laps 1-50: Not officially scored due to oil crisis.
 Lap 51: Donnie Allison started out with the lead.
 Lap 53: Cale Yarborough took over the lead from Donnie Allison.
 Lap 110: Bobby Isaac took over the lead from Cale Yarborough.
 Lap 112: Benny Parsons took over the lead from Bobby Isaac.
 Lap 118: Bobby Isaac took over the lead from Benny Parson.
 Lap 191: Cale Yarborough took over the lead from Bobby Isaac.
 Finish: Cale Yarborough was officially declared the winner.

References

Southeastern 500
Southeastern 500
NASCAR races at Bristol Motor Speedway